Jaklin is both a feminine given name (Yiddish: דזשאַקלין) and a surname. People with the name include:

Given name
 Jaklin Alawi (born 1990), Bulgarian tennis player 
 Jaklin Çarkçı (born 1958), Armenian Turkish opera singer
 Jaklin Kornfilt, American linguist
 Jaklin Zlatanova (born 1988), Bulgarian basketball player

Surname
 Gertrud Jaklin (1916–1998), Austrian jurist
 Ingvald Jaklin (1896–1966), Norwegian politician

See also
 Jaklin Klugman (1977–1996), American Thoroughbred racehorse

Yiddish feminine given names
Bulgarian feminine given names